Verena "Vreni" Schneider (born 26 November 1964) is a retired ski racer from Switzerland. She is the most successful alpine ski racer of her country, the fourth most successful female ski racer ever (after Lindsey Vonn, Annemarie Moser-Pröll and Mikaela Shiffrin) and was voted "Swiss Sportswoman of the Century".

Early life
Schneider was born in Elm, the daughter of a shoemaker. Her mother died of cancer when Schneider was a teenager: as a result she put her ski career on hold and dropped out of school to look after the family home.

Racing career
Schneider made her World Cup debut at the age of 20. Schneider won the overall alpine skiing World Cup three times and eleven discipline World Cups in Slalom and Giant Slalom, along with 55 World Cup races (number four all-time among women to Moser-Pröll, Vonn and Shiffrin).  She also won five medals at the Winter Olympics including 3 golds (Slalom and Giant Slalom at Calgary in 1988 and Slalom at Lillehammer in 1994), and six medals at the World Championships including 3 more golds (Giant Slalom at Crans-Montana in 1987 and Vail in 1989; Slalom at Saalbach in 1991).

During the 1988–89 season she won 14 World Cup races, a record for single season wins that stood until Shiffrin beat that record in the 2018–19 season.

In April 1995, after eleven successful seasons, she announced her retirement. Today she runs a ski and snowboard school in her home village of Elm as well as a sport equipment shop in Glarus.

Vreni Schneider is praised in the Half Man Half Biscuit song 'Uffington Wassail' thus: "Vreni Schneider – you’re my downhill lady! Vreni Schneider – you’re the queen of the slopes!" The song is on the album Trouble Over Bridgwater from the year 2000.

World Cup results

Season titles
14 titles – (3 overall, 6 Slalom, 5 Giant Slalom)

Season standings

Race victories

World Championship results

Olympic results

References

External links
 
 

1964 births
Living people
Swiss female alpine skiers
Alpine skiers at the 1988 Winter Olympics
Alpine skiers at the 1992 Winter Olympics
Alpine skiers at the 1994 Winter Olympics
Olympic gold medalists for Switzerland
Olympic silver medalists for Switzerland
Olympic bronze medalists for Switzerland
Olympic alpine skiers of Switzerland
Olympic medalists in alpine skiing
FIS Alpine Ski World Cup champions
Medalists at the 1988 Winter Olympics
Medalists at the 1994 Winter Olympics
People from the canton of Glarus
20th-century Swiss women